Cartoon Network Australia & New Zealand is an Australian pay television channel launched on October 3, 1995 and owned by Warner Bros. Discovery Asia-Pacific. It primarily shows animated programming.

The channel began broadcasting as a part of the Cartoon Network Asia service on June 30, 1995. It was later separated from the broader pan-Asian service on October 3, 1995.

History
Cartoon Network started its broadcast in Australia in 1995 as the dual-channel TNT & Cartoon Network as part of the Foxtel cable TV launch, operating from 6:00 a.m. to 9:00 p.m., with Turner Classic Movies (formerly TNT) taking the remainder of the daily schedule. On 1 July 1997, Cartoon Network Australia became a separate 24-hour channel, with exclusive local feeds for Sydney, Melbourne, Brisbane, Perth, Adelaide, Newcastle, Darwin, etc. It originally aired only Hanna-Barbera cartoons such as Yogi Bear, Top Cat, The Flintstones etc. The channel quickly started to develop though, airing for the first time MGM cartoons (Tom and Jerry, Droopy, and Spike and Tyke) on 1 January 1996, and (after Time Warner's purchase of Turner in 1996) Warner Bros. shows (Looney Tunes, and several other Looney Tunes related cartoons) on 1 January 1997. In mid-1997, Cartoon Network started to air its first original shows (Space Ghost Coast to Coast, Dexter's Laboratory and The Moxy Show).

In April 2004, the channel was added to TransTV. Cartoon Network had, up until mid-2004, been tied with the Disney Channel as Australia's most popular family network. The removal of older programming from the network during this period led to a fall in average audience share during 2004 as fans of older cartoons moved to Boomerang. Cartoon Network had slipped to second spot among Australian family networks behind the Disney Channel.

In February 2008, Adult Swim relaunched on The Comedy Channel airing shows such as Robot Chicken and Harvey Birdman, Attorney at Law. The network transitioned to a widescreen format presentation on 30 November 2010, ahead of a deadline by Foxtel to do so.

On February 7, 2017, Cartoon Network Australia announced an exclusive video on-demand content deal with the streaming service Stan. As part of the deal, episodes from some shows such as Adventure Time and The Powerpuff Girls will premiere on Stan at the same time as the Cartoon Network Australia channel.

On 22 April 2021, the channel was discontinued on Fetch TV, alongside its sister channel Boomerang.

On 8 January 2022, the channel rebranded to Redraw Your World with new graphics and a new typeface.

Programming

Current

 Adventure Time
 The Amazing World Of Gumball
 Boy Girl Dog Cat Mouse Cheese
 Clarence
 Cupcake & Dino: General Services
 Ekans - Snakes Awake
 Grizzy & the Lemmings
 Jellystone!
 Lamput
 Looney Tunes Cartoons
 Mechamato
 Monkie Kid
 Regular Show
 Steven Universe
 Summer Camp Island
 Teen Titans Go!
 We Bare Bears

Logo history

Program blocks

Current

Adult Swim 

A time block suited for mature audience, targeting adults at least 17 years old and above.  The anime block aired from Monday to Thursday and started at 10:00pm and ended at 12:00am. The comedy block aired on Fridays and Saturdays and started at 10:30 pm and ended at 12:00 am with an encore till 1:30. Before the block was ceased Squidbillies also premiered with a special disclaimer about the content, as did most of the anime.

Prior to its removal for strategic reasons, the Australian feed was one in the Asia-Pacific region to have this block. This block is currently shown on The Comedy Channel with Harvey Birdman and Aqua Teen Hunger Force as well as the premiere of Robot Chicken and Moral Orel. Most of the anime that previously aired on Adult Swim now air on the Sci Fi Channel with its own anime block.

Madman Entertainment has also been releasing Adult Swim DVD in region 4 starting with Aqua Teen, Harvey Birdman and Robot Chicken in 2007. It has since released most volumes of every series that has a DVD, including future releases.

Cartoonito 
Cartoonito launched on 4 July 2022.

Sister channels

Boomerang

Prior becoming a standalone channel on March 14, 2004, Boomerang was its own block dedicated to older Hanna-Barbera cartoons launched in 1995.

Cartoon Network's sister TV channel Boomerang was originally a Cartoon Network block for the lesser-known Hanna-Barbera classic cartoons that didn't already have regular half-hour slots. It began in April 2001 as a morning block airing at 10:00 am – 12:00 pm, but in August 2001 also aired as an hour-long mini-block in Cartoon Network After Dark. The shows on Boomerang changed randomly every week, for both the morning and the evening block. The Boomerang blocks had bumpers which featured children's toys of characters in Hanna-Barbera cartoons coming to life, identical to the Boomerang bumpers used in the United States. These bumpers were sometimes also used on the TV channel. The evening block last aired in March 2002, and the morning block last aired in September 2004. However late-night airings of Boomerang on Cartoon Network continued until early 2005, when the Boomerang channel received a face-lift. In late 2012, it received the looks of Boomerang (UK & Ireland).

References

External links
Official website 
 Cartoon Network on YouTube 
 Cartoon Network on YouTube
Cartoon Network on Facebook

Cartoon Network
Warner Bros. Discovery Asia-Pacific
Turner International Australia
1995 establishments in Australia
AsiaSat
Children's television channels in Australia
Children's television channels in New Zealand
English-language television stations in Australia
English-language television stations in New Zealand
Television channels in New Zealand
Television channels and stations established in 1995